Viking Wai Chun Wong (born 17 January 1987) is a Hong Kong born fashion designer and Brazilian jiu-jitsu (BJJ) black belt practitioner. 

The first Chinese male to qualify and compete at the World IBJJF Jiu-Jitsu Championship at adult black belt level, Wong is the first Chinese black belt Asian IBJJF Jiu-Jitsu male Champion.

Background 
Viking Wong was born on 17 January 1987 in British Hong Kong. Wong's grandmother was a tailor and his family is in the garment manufacturing business.

Growing up, Wong was a competitive swimmer. Wong attended university at the London College of Fashion graduating in 2009 with a First Class Honors degree in womenswear. In the same year, Wong started training BJJ.

After graduating, Wong worked for design houses in the United Kingdom such as Vivenne Westwood, Victoria Beckham and Burberry before starting his own brand. Eventually Wong quit his full time job in fashion to spend more time training and teaching BJJ. In 2016, after getting promoted to black belt, he returned to Hong Kong to provide develop the BJJ scene there.

Brazilian Jiu-Jitsu competitive summary 
Main Achievements (Black Belt)
 ADCC Asian Open Champion (2017)
 IBJJF Asian Champion (2018)
 2nd place IBJJF Asian Championship (2019)
 2nd place ADCC Asian Trials (2017)
 3rd place IBJJF Asian Championship (2017)
 3rd place IBJJF European Championship (2018)

Main Achievements (Coloured Belts)
 3rd place IBJJF Asian Championship (2015 brown)
 3rd place IBJJF European Championship (2014 brown)
 3rd place IBJJF European No-Gi Championship (2014 brown)

Instructor lineage 
Kano Jigoro → Tomita Tsunejiro → Mitsuyo "Count Koma" Maeda → Carlos Gracie, Sr. → Helio Gracie → Rolls Gracie → Mauricio Motta Gomes →  Jude Samuel → Viking Wong

Fashion career 
In 2008 Wong's work was featured in the Victoria & Albert Museum’s Young British Designers: Mapping Future Fashion exhibition.

In 2010, Wong's work was featured in both London Fashion Week and Paris Fashion Week.

In 2011,Wong was selected by Vogue as one of the top twelve Designers to Watch.

In 2014, Wong worked with Shoyoroll to create the Absolute cut version of the Brazilian jiu-jitsu gi.

Personal life 
In 2016, Wong formed the Hong Kong-China Brazilian Jiu-Jitsu Association. In addition, Wong has founded Jiu-Jitsu Sans Frontiere, a network of gyms across Asia.

Wong has spent time providing grappling training to the Hong Kong Police Force as well as the Philippine National Police and People's Armed Police.

Wong currently resides in Italy with his family.

Notes

References

External links 

1987 births
Living people
Alumni of the London College of Fashion
Chinese fashion designers
Hong Kong practitioners of Brazilian jiu-jitsu
Hong Kong fashion designers
People awarded a black belt in Brazilian jiu-jitsu
Chinese expatriates in Italy